This is a list of Kazakh football transfers in the summer transfer window 2022 by club, running from 28 June to 26 July. Only clubs of the 2022 Kazakhstan Premier League are included.

Kazakhstan Premier League 2022

Aksu

In:

Out:

Aktobe

In:

Out:

Akzhayik

In:

Out:

Astana

In:

Out:

Atyrau

In:

Out:

Caspiy

In:

Out:

Kairat

In:

Out:

Kyzylzhar

In:

Out:

Maktaaral

In:

Out:

Ordabasy

In:

Out:

Shakhter

In:

Out:

Taraz

In:

Out:

Tobol

In:

Out:

Turan

In:

Out:

References

Kazakhstan
2022
Transfers